The 2010 Munster Senior Hurling Championship Final was a hurling match played on 7 June 2010 at Semple Stadium, Thurles, County Tipperary. It was contested by Cork and Waterford. The final finished in a draw with a scoreline of 2-15 each. The final was replayed the following Saturday night, with Waterford claiming the first Munster Championship of the decade, their ninth overall, beating Cork by three points after extra time.

Previous Munster Final encounters
Previous to this encounter, the teams had met each other in twelve Munster Hurling Finals, including a replay in 1931. Cork lead the rivalry, having won eight finals in comparison to Waterford's three wins. Notable finals include 1982, when Cork beat Waterford by 31 points (Munster Final record) and the previous year's final when Cork beat Waterford by 4 points, even after a hat trick of goals by Waterford's John Mullane.

Match details

Replay

See also
 Cork and Waterford hurling rivalry

References

External links
 Match Details at Hurlingstats.com
 Replay Details at Hurlingstats.com

Munster
Munster Senior Hurling Championship Finals
Cork county hurling team matches
Waterford GAA matches